Gwanyang-dong is a neighborhood of Dongan district in the city of Anyang, Gyeonggi Province, South Korea. It is officially divided into Gwanyang-1-dong and Gwanyang-2-dong.

External links
 Gwanyang-1-dong 
 Gwanyang-2-dong 

Dongan-gu
Neighbourhoods in Anyang, Gyeonggi